Jared Mason Diamond (born September 10, 1937) is an American scientist and author best known for his popular science books The Third Chimpanzee (1991), Guns, Germs, and Steel (1997), Collapse: How Societies Choose to Fail or Succeed (2005), and The World Until Yesterday (2012). Originally trained in physiology, Diamond's work is known for drawing from a variety of fields, and he is currently Professor of Geography at the University of California, Los Angeles. The Jared Diamond bibliography includes both his scientific and popular works.

, the Microsoft Academic Search database lists 538 publications with Diamond as an author, including collaborations with 343 co-authors.

Books

 1972 Avifauna of the Eastern Highlands of New Guinea, Publications of the Nuttall Ornithological Club, No. 12, Cambridge, Mass., pp. 438.
 1975 M. L. Cody and J. M. Diamond, eds. Ecology and Evolution of Communities. Belknap Press, Harvard University Press, Cambridge, Mass.
 1979 J. M. Diamond and M. LeCroy. Birds of Karkar and Bagabag Islands, New Guinea. Bull. Amer. Mus. Nat. Hist. 164:469–531
 1984 J. M. Diamond. The Avifaunas of Rennell and Bellona Islands. The Natural History of Rennell Islands, British Solomon Islands 8:127–168
 1986 J. M. Diamond and T. J. Case. eds. Community Ecology. Harper and Row, New York
 1986 B. Beehler, T. Pratt, D. Zimmerman, H. Bell, B. Finch, J. M. Diamond, and J. Coe. Birds of New Guinea. Princeton University Press, Princeton
 1992 The Third Chimpanzee: The Evolution and Future of the Human Animal, 
 1997 Why is Sex Fun? The Evolution of Human Sexuality, 
 1997 Guns, Germs, and Steel: The Fates of Human Societies. W.W. Norton & Co. 
 2001 The Birds of Northern Melanesia: Speciation, Ecology, & Biogeography (with Ernst Mayr), 
 2003 Guns, Germs, and Steel Reader's Companion, .
 2005 Collapse: How Societies Choose to Fail or Succeed. New York: Penguin Books. .
 2010 Natural Experiments of History (with James A. Robinson).  
 2012 The World Until Yesterday: What Can We Learn from Traditional Societies? .
 2015 The Third Chimpanzee for Young People: The Evolution and Future of the Human Animal, Seven Stories Press, .
 2019 Upheaval: Turning Points for Nations in Crisis, Little, Brown and Company, .

Articles
 
Diamond, J. M. (1964). “The Mechanism of Isotonic Water Transport”, The Journal of General Physiology. 48: 15-42 . doi:10.1085.jpg.48.1.15
 
 
 
 
 
 
 
 
 
 
 
 
 
 
 
 
 
 
 Island Biogeography and the Design of Natural Reserves (1976), in Robert M. May's Theoretical Ecology: Principles and Applications, Blackwell Scientific Publications, pp. 163–186.
 
 
 
 
 
 
 
 
 
 
 
 
 
 
 
 
 
 
 
 
 
 
 
 
 
 
 
 
 
 
 
 
 
 
 
 
 
 
 
 The Worst Mistake in the History of the Human Race  (May 1987) Discover pp. 64–66
 
 
 
 
 
 
 
 Curse and Blessing of the Ghetto (March 1991) Discover, pp. 60–66
 
 
 
 
 
 
 
 
 Dining With the Snakes (April 1994) Discover
 Race Without Color (November 1994) Discover
 
 
 
 The Curse of QWERTY (April 1997) Discover
 Kinship With The Stars (May 1997) Discover
 Japanese Roots (June 1998) Discover
 
 
 
 
 
 Jianguo Liu and Jared Diamond, "China's environment in a globalizing world", Nature, volume 435, pages 1179–1186, 30 June 2005.
 What’s Your Consumption Factor? (January 2, 2008) The New York Times
 Vengeance is Ours (April 2008) The New Yorker

References

Bibliographies by writer
Bibliographies of American writers
Works by Jared Diamond